Bob Bryan and Mike Bryan defeated Julien Benneteau and Édouard Roger-Vasselin in the final, 6–3, 7–6(7–3) to win the doubles tennis title at the 2014 Shanghai Masters. They completed the career Golden Masters with the win.

Ivan Dodig and Marcelo Melo were the defending champions, but lost in the quarterfinals to Rohan Bopanna and Florin Mergea.

Seeds
All seeds receive a bye into the second round.

Draw

Finals

Top half

Bottom half

References
 Main Draw

Shanghai Rolex Masters - Doubles
Doubles